The Nigeria Customs Service (NCS) is an independent customs service under the supervisory oversight of the Nigerian Ministry of Finance, responsible for the collection of customs revenue, Facilitation of both national and international trade and anti-smuggling activities.

Structure

The NCS is headed by the comptroller general, who oversees the work of six deputy comptrollers general in the following departments:

 Finance and Technical Service;
 Tariff & Trade;
 Enforcement, Investigation, and Inspection;
 Modernization, Research and Economic Relations; 
 Excise, Industrial Incentives and Free Trade Zone;
 Human Resource Development.

The NCS board is chaired by the minister of finance, while the vice-chairman is Col. Hameed Ali, the service's comptroller general who is not a career Customs staff, but was appointed by President [adamu Muhammad]] with the aim of reforming and revamping the institution.

In addition, the NCS operates a media division with radio and television operations, the Nigeria Customs Broadcasting Network.

Reputation 
The Nigerian government claims that the service in recent times has redeemed its image from a Corruption riddled government agency to a new organization, that has cleaned itself of corrupt practices pointing to the fact that since the year 2017  its  revenue contribution to the country continue to rise above one trillion Naira annually.

Despite the claims of the government that the reputation of the service has improved from a corrupt government agency to an agency that has imbibed the spirit of selflessness to the country over self enrichment of its officers, several examples of extensive bribery and corruption allegations still exist.

One example (cited by the government) of an incidence that demonstrated a new customs service was the rejection of the sum of $415,000 bribe by an official of the service Bashir Abubakar, being the money offered to him in order to facilitate the release of containers of dangerous drugs at Apapa Port in Lagos

The Nigeria Customs service is known to have a reputation that has been marred by numerous corruption and fraud scandals across the years. According to Transparency International's 2010 Global Corruption Barometer, more than half of local households surveyed attested to paying bribes to NCS officers in 2009.
 
To date, compromised staff, complex regulations and bureaucracy surrounding the import and export of goods has nurtured an environment in which bribes are commonly paid. Several companies are also believed to undervalue their goods upon importation to avoid penalties. Yet other companies, operating in the informal economy, resort to smuggling as a means of avoiding legal trade.

Notably, a number of foreign companies have been involved in fraud and corruption scandals in recent years:

 Three subsidiaries of Vetco International – Vetco Gray Controls Inc, Vetco Gray Controls Ltd and Vetco Gray UK Ltd – pleaded guilty to violating anti-bribery provisions of the Foreign Corrupt Practices Act (FCPA) when they admitted to making US$2.1 million worth of corrupt payments over a two-year period to officers in the NCS through Panalpina, a Swiss-based freight forwarding firm in Nigeria. 
 At the same time as the subsidiaries were charged, another Vetco subsidiary – Aibel International Ltd – entered into a deferred prosecution agreement with the US Department of Justice for its involvement in the same scandal. This deferred prosecution agreement entailed co-operation with the Department of Justice, stricter controls and the retention of FCPA monitors. Subsequently, however, the company admitted to failing to comply with its obligations and paid a monetary fine. 
 Oil services firm Transocean Ltd made corrupt payments to the value of US$90,000 to Nigerian customs officials between 2002 and 2007 to extend its importation status and receive false paperwork. 
 Tidewater Inc., an oil service firm, paid US$1.6 million through Panalpina to Nigerian customs officials to clear vessels into Nigerian waters.  
 Noble Energy authorised payments by its local subsidiary to obtain eight temporary permits.  In November 2011, Noble, Transocean and Tidewater were three of the companies that settled allegations of involvement in a US$100 million bribery scheme in Nigeria, as part of the Panalpina settlements.
 Royal Dutch Shell entered into a U.S. plea deal in November 2010 over its contractor's involvement in bribing Nigerian customs officials. US authorities accused Shell's subsidiary Shell Nigerian Exploration and Production Co Ltd. of bribing Nigerian customs officials US$3.5 million to quickly process needed equipment for its offshore Bonga field. A heavy fine was levied on Shell after Panalpina, which was also employed by Shell, agreed to plead guilty to taking bribes on behalf of its clients.

Outside of FCPA litigation, there are several examples of everyday Nigerian businessmen being urged to pay bribes to customs officials in order to smooth the passage of their goods. This has led many Nigerians and activists to call for far reaching reforms that would place corruption at the back seat and seal up revenue leakages.

Directors and Comptroller-General past and present 

 Shehu Ahmadu Musa, as director of NCS 1978-1979
Jacob Gyang Buba, as Comptroller-General, 2004- May 2008
Hamman Bello, as Comptroller-General, May 2008- January 2009
Bernard Shaw Nwadialo, as Comptroller-General January 2009- August 2009
Abdullahi Dikko, as Comptroller-General 2009-2015
Hameed Ali, as Comptroller-General 2015–present

References

External links 
 
NCS Carrier Portal

Government of Nigeria
Foreign trade of Nigeria
Customs services